Colors Marathi (previously known as ETV Marathi) is an Indian general entertainment channel that primarily broadcasts Marathi entertainment based in Maharashtra. It is owned by Viacom18.

History
The channel was rebranded under the Viacom18 Colors franchise on 22 March 2015 with the tagline "Saaj Nava, Rang Nava साज नवा, रंग नवा" (translation: New Trappings, New Colour). It again rebranded itself in July 2015 with a new tagline "Rang Marathi, Gandh Marathi रंग मराठी, गंध मराठी" (translation: Colour Marathi, Fragrance Marathi). After that, it again rebranded itself in 2019 with the current tagline "Jagnyache Rang Marathi जगण्याचे रंग मराठी" (translation: Life's Colour is Marathi). Due to the COVID-19 pandemic, they stopped their current programming on 21 March 2020 and resumed programming on 21 July 2020 after 4 months.

Award functions

Current broadcast

Former broadcast

Drama series
 Asava Sundar Swapnancha Bangla असावा सुंदर स्वप्नांचा बंगला
 Assa Sasar Surekh Baai अस्सं सासर सुरेख बाई
 Chahool चाहूल
 Chandra Aahe Sakshila चंद्र आहे साक्षीला
 Char Divas Sasuche चार दिवस सासूचे
 Ganpati Bappa Morya गणपती बाप्पा मोरया
 Ghadge & Suun घाडगे अँड सून
 Jeev Zala Yeda Pisa जीव झाला येडापिसा
 Kunku Tikali Ani Tatoo कुंकू टिकली आणि टॅटू
 Lakshmi Sadaiv Mangalam लक्ष्मी सदैव मंगलम्
 Lek Majhi Durga लेक माझी दुर्गा
 Radha Prem Rangi Rangali राधा प्रेम रंगी रंगली
 Raja Ranichi Ga Jodi राजा रानीची गं जोडी
 Sakhya Re सख्या रे
 Saraswati सरस्वती
 Shubhmangal Online शुभमंगल ऑनलाईन
 Sukhachya Sarini He Man Baware सुखाच्या सरींनी हे मन बावरे
 Swamini स्वामिनी
 Tu Majha Saangaati तू माझा सांगाती
 1760 Sasubai १७६० सासूबाई
 Aai Mayecha Kavach आई मायेचं कवच
 Aapli Manasa आपली माणसं
 Aawaj आवाज
 Bajirao Mastani बाजीराव मस्तानी
 Balpan Dega Deva बालपण देगा देवा
 Bayko Ashi Havvi बायको अशी हव्वी
 Bedhundh Manachi Lahar बेधुंद मनाची लहर
 Bhagyavidhata भाग्यविधाता
 Chiranjivi Saubhagya Kankshini चिरंजीवी सौभाग्य कांक्षिणी
 Crime Diary क्राईम डायरी
 Ek Hota Raja एक होता राजा
 Ek Mohor Abol एक मोहोर अबोल
 Ek Jhunj Wadalashi एक झुंज वादळाशी
 Gandh Phulancha Gela Sangun गंध फुलांचा गेला सांगून
 Gunda Purush Dev गुंडा पुरुष देव
 Hamma Live हम्मा लाइव्ह
 Hridayi Preet Jagate हृदयी प्रीत जागते
 Hukumachi Rani हुकुमाची राणी
 Hya Gojirwanya Gharat ह्या गोजिरवाण्या घरात
 Kamala कमला
 Kalay Tasmai Namah कालाय तस्मै नमः
 Kata Rute Kunala काटा रुते कुणाला
 Kimayagar किमयागार
 Kiti Sangaychay Mala किती सांगायचंय मला
 Kumari Gangubai Non Matric कुमारी गंगूबाई नॉन मॅट्रिक
 Kundali कुंडली
 Lek Ladki Hya Gharchi लेक लाडकी ह्या घरची
 Manthan मंथन
 Maza Hoshil Ka माझा होशील का
 Maze Man Tuze Zhale माझे मन तुझे झाले
 Maziya Mahera माझिया माहेरा
 Mendichya Panavar मेंदीच्या पानावर 
 Sakhi सखी 
 Samantar समांतर 
 Sata Janmachya Gathi साता जन्माच्या गाठी Savar Re सावर रे Saptapadi सप्तपदी Shree Laxminarayan श्री लक्ष्मीनारायण Soniyacha Umbara सोनियाचा उंबरा Sonyachi Pavala सोन्याची पावलं Sukhi Manasacha Sadara सुखी माणसाचा सदरा Sundar Maza Ghar सुंदर माझं घर Tuzya Vachun Karmena तुझ्या वाचून करमेना Tuzya Rupacha Chandana तुझ्या रूपाचं चांदणं Vachan Dile Tu Mala वचन दिले तू मला Vivahbandhan विवाहबंधन Ya Valnavar या वळणावरDubbed shows
 Geeta गीता Karmaphal Daata Shani कर्मफल दाता शनि Naagin नागीणReality shows
 Bigg Boss Marathi बिग बॉस मराठी Bigg Boss Marathi (season 1) बिग बॉस मराठी १ Bigg Boss Marathi (season 2) बिग बॉस मराठी २ Bigg Boss Marathi (season 3) बिग बॉस मराठी ३ Bigg Boss Marathi (season 4) बिग बॉस मराठी ४ Comedy Express कॉमेडी एक्सप्रेस Dholkichya Talavar ढोलकीच्या तालावर Kon Hoeel Marathi Crorepati कोण होईल मराठी करोडपती Sur Nava Dhyas Nava सूर नवा ध्यास नवा Zhunj Marathmoli झुंज मराठमोळी Gaurav Maharashtracha गौरव महाराष्ट्राचा Aaj Kay Special आज काय स्पेशल Don Special दोन स्पेशल Tumchyasathi Kay Pan तुमच्यासाठी काय पन Mejwani Paripoorna Kitchen मेजवानी परिपूर्ण किचन Navra Asava Tar Asa नवरा असावा तर असा Ekdam Kadak एकदम कडक Naadkhula नादखुळा MAD i.e. Maharashtracha Assal Dancer मॅड म्हणजेच महाराष्ट्राचा अस्सल डान्सर Assal Pahune Irsaal Namune अस्सल पाहुणे इरसाल नमुने Mrs. Annapurna मिसेस अन्नपूर्णा Perfect Bachelor परफेक्ट बॅचलर Aali Lahar Kela Kahar आली लहर केला कहर Aamchya Gharat Sunbai Jorat आमच्या घरात सूनबाई जोरात Sangeet Khurchi संगीत खुर्ची Darshan दर्शन Sakkhe Shejari सख्खे शेजारी Palakhi पालखी Gajar Harinamacha गजर हरिनामाचा Lajjat Maharashtrachi लज्जत महाराष्ट्राची ''

References

Television stations in Mumbai
Marathi-language television channels
Television channels and stations established in 2000
ETV Network
Viacom 18
2000 establishments in Maharashtra
Mass media in Mumbai
Mass media in Maharashtra